Kalej Rural District is a rural district (dehestan) in the Central District of Nowshahr County, Mazandaran Province, Iran. At the 2006 census, its population was 12,427, in 3,362 families. The rural district has 17 villages.

References 

Rural Districts of Mazandaran Province
Nowshahr County